Hyde Parker Island is a member of the Queen Elizabeth Islands and the Arctic Archipelago in the territory of Nunavut. It is an irregularly shaped island located in the Penny Strait, between Bathurst Island and Devon Island. John Barrow Island lies directly to the north, while Sir John Barrow Monument is to the east.

References
Notes

External links
 Hyde Parker Island in the Atlas of Canada - Toporama; Natural Resources Canada

Islands of the Queen Elizabeth Islands
Uninhabited islands of Qikiqtaaluk Region
Islands of Baffin Bay